Billy Winward (9 November 1920 - 4 June 2015) was a former  Australian rules footballer who played with St Kilda in the Victorian Football League (VFL).

inward played with Camberwell Football Club in 1945.

Notes

External links 

1920 births
2015 deaths
Australian rules footballers from Victoria (Australia)
St Kilda Football Club players
Camberwell Football Club players